Matt Papa is an American contemporary Christian music singer, songwriter, hymn writer and worship leader. In 2009, his album Your Kingdom Come charted #46 on the Billboard Top Christian Albums and #33 on the Top Heatseekers chart. He released the EP "Church Songs," in October 2016. Papa has worked extensively with Keith & Kristyn Getty as well as singer & songwriter Matt Boswell on several releases.

Discography
You Are Good (2006)
Worship Vol. 1 (2007)
Your Kingdom Come (2008)
Scripture Songs & Hymns 1 (2009)
Your Kingdom Come (2009)
Scripture Songs & Hymns 2 (2010)
This Changes Everything (2011)
Look & Live (2 Cities Music/The Summit Church) (2013)
Church Songs (2016)
Songs From The Wilderness (2019)
His Mercy Is More (2019)

Singles

References

1983 births
Centricity Music artists
Living people
People from Gainesville, Georgia
Musicians from Georgia (U.S. state)
21st-century American singers
Singer-songwriters from Georgia (U.S. state)